Je te mangerais (literally I will eat you in English; marketed under the title You Will be Mine) is a 2009 French drama film written and directed by Sophie Laloy.

Synopsis 

The movie is about the complicated relations between two young girls: a student in the Conservatoire de Musique classique de Lyon and her lesbian medical student roommate.

Cast 
 Judith Davis : Marie Dandin
 Isild Le Besco : Emma
 Édith Scob : Mademoiselle Lainé
 Johan Libéreau : Sami Decker 
 Marc Chapiteau : Hervé Dandin
 Fabienne Babe : Odile Dandin
 Alain Beigel  : Yves
 Denis Ménochet : Yves's friend

External links 
  
  Je te mangerais on BobThèque
 
 
 Je te mangerais (You Will Be Mine) (2009) - Rotten Tomatoes

2009 films
Female bisexuality in film
2009 romantic drama films
French LGBT-related films
Lesbian-related films
Films set in Lyon
Films shot in Lyon
Films shot in Paris
2000s French films